Renato Alves Carneiro better known as Renato Moicano (born May 21, 1989) is a Brazilian mixed martial artist who competes in the Lightweight division of the Ultimate Fighting Championship. A professional MMA competitor since 2010, Moicano made a name for himself fighting all over his home country of Brazil, and is the former interim Jungle Fight Featherweight Champion. As of November 14, 2022, he is #13 in the UFC lightweight rankings.

Background
Coming from a well-off family, Carneiro started training judo at the age of eight. He attended university in order to become a lawyer, but dropped out after two years to pursue a career in mixed martial arts.

Mixed martial arts career
After an undefeated professional record in eight fights, Moicano faced Ismael Bonfim for the interim Jungle Fight Featherweight Championship. He won the fight via rear naked choke submission in the first round.

Ultimate Fighting Championship
On December 12, 2014 it was announced that Moicano signed with the UFC, and was scheduled to replace Rony Jason against Tom Niinimäki on 10 days notice at UFC Fight Night: Machida vs. Dollaway. He won the fight via rear naked choke submission in the second round.

Moicano later was scheduled to fight Mirsad Bektic on May 30, 2015 at UFC Fight Night: Condit vs. Alves, but he was pulled from the bout due to injury and replaced by Lucas Martins.

On March 14, 2016 it was announced that Moicano would face Zubaira Tukhugov at UFC 198. for his second UFC appearance. He was the underdog to the fight but won via split decision.

Moicano was expected to face Mike De La Torre on September 24, 2016 at UFC Fight Night 95, but was forced to pull out with injury and was replaced on short notice by Godofredo Pepey.

For his third fight, Moicano faced Jeremy Stephens on April 15, 2017 at UFC on Fox 24. He won the fight by split decision.

Moicano faced Brian Ortega on July 29, 2017 at UFC 214. He lost the fight via guillotine choke submission in the third round. This fight earned Fight of the Night bonus. After the fight with Ortega, Moicano moved from Brazil to United States in order to train at the American Top Team.

Moicano faced Calvin Kattar on April 7, 2018 at UFC 223. He won the fight by unanimous decision.

Moicano faced Cub Swanson on August 4, 2018 at UFC 227. He won the fight via a rear naked choke submission.  This win earned him the Performance of the Night award.

Moicano was scheduled to face Mirsad Bektic on December 8, 2018 at UFC 231; however, it was reported on 15 November 2018 that Bektic was forced to pull out of the bout due to an undisclosed injury and the bout was cancelled.

Moicano faced José Aldo on February 2, 2019 in the co-main event at UFC Fight Night 144. He lost the fight via TKO in the second round.

Moicano faced Chan Sung Jung on June 22, 2019 in the main event at UFC on ESPN+ 12. He lost the fight via TKO in the first round.

Moicano faced Damir Hadžović in a lightweight bout on March 14, 2020 at UFC Fight Night 170. He won the fight via a rear naked choke submission in round one.

Moicano was scheduled to face Magomed Mustafaev on October 18, 2020 at UFC Fight Night 180. However, Moicano pulled out of the fight in mid-September for undisclosed reasons. Two weeks later, it was reported that Moicano was scheduled to face Rafael Fiziev on November 28, 2020 at UFC on ESPN: Smith vs. Clark. In turn, Moicano pulled out on November 28 after testing positive for COVID-19 and the bout was rescheduled for UFC 256. He lost the fight via TKO in the first round.

Moicano faced Jai Herbert on June 26, 2021 at UFC Fight Night 190. He won the fight via a rear naked choke in round two.

Moicano faced Alexander Hernandez on February 12, 2022 at UFC 271. He won the bout via rear naked choke in the second round.

Moicano was tabbed as a short notice replacement for Rafael Fiziev and faced Rafael dos Anjos on March 5, 2022 at UFC 272. The bout was contested at a catchweight of 160 pounds. He lost the fight via unanimous decision.

Moicano faced Brad Riddell on November 12, 2022 at UFC 281. He won the bout via a rear naked choke in the first round.

Moicano is scheduled to face Arman Tsarukyan on April 29, 2023,  at UFC Fight Night 223.

Personal life
Moicano and his wife have a son (born 2020).

Championships and achievements

Mixed martial arts
Jungle Fight
Interim Jungle Fight Featherweight Championship (One time)
 Ultimate Fighting Championship
Fight of the Night (One time) 
Performance of the Night (One time) 
ESPN
2022 Best On-The-Mic moment of the Year at UFC 281

Mixed martial arts record 

|-
|Win
|align=center|17–5–1
|Brad Riddell
|Submission (rear-naked choke)
|UFC 281
|
|align=center|1
|align=center|3:20
|New York City, New York, United States
|
|-
|Loss
|align=center|16–5–1
|Rafael dos Anjos
|Decision (unanimous)
|UFC 272
|
|align=center|5
|align=center|5:00
|Las Vegas, Nevada, United States
|
|-
|Win
|align=center|16–4–1
|Alexander Hernandez
|Submission (rear-naked choke)
|UFC 271
|
|align=center|2
|align=center|1:23
|Houston, Texas, United States
|
|-
|Win
|align=center|15–4–1 
|Jai Herbert
|Submission (rear-naked choke)
|UFC Fight Night: Gane vs. Volkov 
|
|align=center|2
|align=center|4:36
|Las Vegas, Nevada, United States
|
|-
|Loss
|align=center|
|Rafael Fiziev
|KO (punches)
|UFC 256
|
|align=center|1
|align=center|4:05
|Las Vegas, Nevada, United States
|
|-
|Win
|align=center|14–3–1
|Damir Hadžović
|Submission (rear-naked choke)
|UFC Fight Night: Lee vs. Oliveira 
|
|align=center|1
|align=center|0:44
|Brasília, Brazil
|
|-
|Loss
|align=center|13–3–1
|Jung Chan-sung
|TKO (punches)
|UFC Fight Night: Moicano vs. The Korean Zombie 
|
|align=center|1
|align=center|0:58
|Greenville, South Carolina, United States
|
|-
|Loss
|align=center|13–2–1
|José Aldo
|TKO (punches)
|UFC Fight Night: Assunção vs. Moraes 2 
|
|align=center|2
|align=center|0:44
|Fortaleza, Brazil
|
|-
|Win
|align=center|13–1–1
|Cub Swanson
|Submission (rear-naked choke)
|UFC 227 
|
|align=center|1
|align=center|4:15
|Los Angeles, California, United States
|
|- 
|Win
|align=center|12–1–1
|Calvin Kattar
|Decision (unanimous)
|UFC 223
|
|align=center|3
|align=center|5:00
|Brooklyn, New York, United States
|
|-
|Loss
|align=center|11–1–1
|Brian Ortega
|Submission (guillotine choke)
|UFC 214
|
|align=center|3
|align=center|2:59
|Anaheim, California, United States
|
|-
|Win
|align=center|11–0–1
|Jeremy Stephens
|Decision (split)
|UFC on Fox: Johnson vs. Reis
|
|align=center|3
|align=center|5:00
|Kansas City, Missouri, United States
|
|-
|Win
|align=center| 10–0–1
|Zubaira Tukhugov
|Decision (split)
|UFC 198
|
|align=center|3
|align=center|5:00
|Curitiba, Brazil
|
|-
|Win
|align=center| 9–0–1
|Tom Niinimäki
|Submission (rear-naked choke)
|UFC Fight Night: Machida vs. Dollaway
|
|align=center| 2
|align=center| 3:30
|Barueri, Brazil
|
|-
|Win
|align=center| 8–0–1
|Ismael Bonfim
|Submission (rear-naked choke)
|Jungle Fight 71
|
|align=center| 1
|align=center| 2:59
|São Paulo, Brazil
|
|-
|Win
|align=center| 7–0–1
|Nilson Pereira
|Decision (unanimous)
|Jungle Fight 55
|
|align=center| 3
|align=center| 5:00
|Rio de Janeiro, Brazil
|
|-
|Win
|align=center| 6–0–1
|Mauro Chaulet
|Submission (rear-naked choke)
|Jungle Fight 50
|
|align=center| 2
|align=center| 2:53
|Novo Hamburgo, Brazil
|
|-
|style="background-color: #c5d2ea; text-align:center"|Draw
|align=center| 5–0–1
|Felipe Froes
|Draw (majority)
|Shooto Brazil 36
|
|align=center| 3
|align=center| 5:00
|Brasília, Brazil
|
|-
|Win
|align=center| 5–0
|Iliarde Santos
|Decision (unanimous)
|Jungle Fight 29
|
|align=center| 3
|align=center| 5:00
|Serra, Brazil
|
|-
|Win
|align=center| 4–0
|João Luiz Nogueira
|Decision (unanimous)
|Jungle Fight 25
|
|align=center| 3
|align=center| 5:00
|Vila Velha, Brazil
|
|-
|Win
|align=center| 3–0
|Eduardo Felipe
|Submission (rear-naked choke)
|Jungle Fight 24
|
|align=center| 2
|align=center| 2:49
|Rio de Janeiro, Brazil
|
|-
|Win
|align=center| 2–0
|João Paulo Rodrigues
|Decision (unanimous)
|Jungle Fight 21
|
|align=center| 3
|align=center| 5:00
|Natal, Brazil
|
|-
|Win
|align=center| 1–0
|Alexandre Almeida
|Submission (rear-naked choke)
|Jungle Fight 18
|
|align=center| 3
|align=center| 1:56
|São Paulo, Brazil
|
|-

Submission Grappling record

See also
 List of current UFC fighters
 List of male mixed martial artists

Notes

References

External links
 
 

Brazilian male mixed martial artists
1989 births
Living people
Featherweight mixed martial artists
Mixed martial artists utilizing Muay Thai
Mixed martial artists utilizing judo
Mixed martial artists utilizing Brazilian jiu-jitsu
Sportspeople from Brasília
Brazilian Muay Thai practitioners
Brazilian practitioners of Brazilian jiu-jitsu
People awarded a black belt in Brazilian jiu-jitsu
Brazilian male judoka
Ultimate Fighting Championship male fighters